Andrea Stone is an American journalist. She was a long-time correspondent for USA Today.

Early life and education
From the Bronx, New York City, she graduated the Columbia University Graduate School of Journalism.

Career
First she worked for newspapers in Illinois, Florida, and New York, including the Riverdale Press, and freelanced for Newsweek, Business Week, Chicago Tribune, The Gainesville Sun. She also worked with Gannett News Service in Arlington, Virginia. She also worked as bureau chief for Washington for AOL News.

In 1985 she was hired by USA Today and worked there for over 25 years.
 In 2001, The Register criticized her piece on cyber-war as reading like government propaganda. In 2002, she was told by the Huffington Post to delete a Facebook post asking if Nazis felt "more comfortable" with the GOP than other parties, which was covered in Forbes. Of other articles she's written for USA Today, she covered topics like 9/11 at the Pentagon.

In 2011, she was hired by Huffington Post Media as Senior National Correspondent in politics, and that year was mentioned at the National Press Club by Arianna Huffington and Tim Armstrong.

In April 2013, she was hired as a senior online executive producer of Al Jazeera America.

By 2015, she had worked as a freelancer for National Geographic and other publications. She had also taught as an adjunct professor at American University in Washington, D.C. In 2015, she became director of career services for the CUNY Graduate School of Journalism. She retired in June 2019.

Stone has appeared on CNN and C-SPAN. She co-authored "Desert Warriors: Men and Women Who Won the Persian Gulf War."

References

External links

Living people
Year of birth missing (living people)
American freelance journalists
City University of New York staff
Lehman College alumni
Columbia University Graduate School of Journalism alumni
CUNY Graduate School of Journalism faculty